George William Foster (born October 7, 1955) is an American businessman and physicist serving as the U.S. representative for  since 2013. He is a member of the Democratic Party.

Early life and education
Foster was born in 1955 in Madison, Wisconsin. As a teenager, he attended James Madison Memorial High School. He received his bachelor's degree in physics from the University of Wisconsin–Madison in 1976 and his Ph.D. in physics from Harvard University in 1983. The title of his doctoral dissertation is "An experimental limit on proton decay: ."

Physics career
After completing his Ph.D., Foster moved to the Fox Valley with his family to pursue a career in high-energy (particle) physics at Fermilab, a Department of Energy National Laboratory. During his 22 years at Fermilab, he participated in several projects, including the design of equipment and data analysis software for the CDF Detector, which were used in the discovery of the top quark, and the management of the design and construction of a 3 km Anti-Proton Recycler Ring for the Main Injector.

In 1998, Foster was elected a fellow of the American Physical Society. He was a member of the team that received the 1989 Bruno Rossi Prize for cosmic ray physics for the discovery of the neutrino burst from the supernova SN 1987A. He also received the Institute of Electrical and Electronics Engineers' Particle Accelerator Technology Prize and was awarded an Energy Conservation award from the United States Department of Energy for his application of permanent magnets for Fermilab's accelerators. He and Stephen D. Holmes received the Robert R. Wilson Prize for Achievement in the Physics of Particle Accelerators in 2022 for "leadership in developing the modern accelerator complex at Fermilab, enabling the success of the Tevatron program that supports rich programs in neutrino and precision physics."

U.S. House of Representatives

Elections
2008 special

On November 26, 2007, former House Republican Speaker J. Dennis Hastert resigned as the Representative from Illinois's 14th congressional district. Foster announced his candidacy to fill the vacancy on May 30, 2007. In the March special election, Foster defeated Republican nominee and Hastert-endorsed candidate Jim Oberweis, 53%–47%.

2008 general

In November, Oberweis ran against Foster again. Foster won reelection to a full term, 58%–42%.

2010

Foster was challenged by Republican nominee State Senator Randy Hultgren and Green Party nominee Daniel Kairis. Despite being endorsed by the Chicago Tribune, the Chicago Sun-Times and The Daily Herald, Foster lost to Hultgren, 51%–45%.

2012

In May 2011, Foster sold his home in Geneva, moved to Naperville and announced plans to run for Congress in the 11th district, which encompasses Aurora, Joliet, Lisle in addition to Naperville. It also includes roughly a quarter of his former district. The district had previously been the 13th, represented by seven-term Republican Judy Biggert. Although Biggert's home in Hinsdale had been shifted to the Chicago-based 5th district, Biggert opted to seek election in the 11th, which contained half of her old territory.

On November 6, 2012, Foster won the election for the 11th district with 58% of the vote.

2014

Foster ran again and was unopposed in the Democratic primary. In the general election, he defeated the Republican nominee, State Representative Darlene Senger, with 53.5% of the vote to her 46.5%.

2016

Foster ran again and was unopposed in the Democratic primary. In the general election, he defeated the Republican nominee, Tonia Khouri, with 60.4% of the vote to her 39.6%.

2018

Foster again was unopposed in the Democratic primary. In the general election, he defeated the Republican nominee, Nick Stella, with 63.8% of the vote to Stella's 36.2%.

2020

Foster faced a primary challenge from Rachel Ventura and won the nomination with 58.7% of the vote. In the general election, he defeated Republican nominee, Rick Laib, with 63.3% of the vote.

2022

Foster won the June 28 Democratic primary and is running for reelection to the House in the November 8 general election. In the general election, he defeated Catalina Lauf with 56.45% of the vote.

Tenure
Although it was initially thought that Foster would not be sworn in until April 2008 due to the need to count absentee ballots before his first election was certified, he took the oath of office on March 11, 2008.

Foster joined Vern Ehlers and Rush Holt Jr. as the only research physicists ever elected to Congress. On his first day in office, he cast the deciding vote to keep from tabling an ethics bill that would create an independent outside panel to investigate ethics complaints against House members.

Fundraising
According to OpenSecrets, Foster received $637,050 from labor-related political action committees during his runs for Congress. $180,000 of this money came from PACs linked to public sector unions. $110,000 of these donations came from PACs linked to industrial labor unions.

According to the Federal Election Commission, Nancy Pelosi gave $4,000 to Foster's 2012 campaign committee. PACs under Pelosi's control donated $10,000 to his 2012 campaign.

Taxes

Foster supported allowing the Bush tax cuts to expire. During a debate with his opponent in the 2012 election, Foster said, "The tax cuts were promised to generate job growth, but did not. If you follow the money, when you give a dollar to a very wealthy person, they won't typically put it back into the local economy." He said the tax benefits ended up in overseas accounts and spent on luxury purchases.

Foster has opposed efforts to repeal the estate tax. On August 31, 2005, U.S. Newswire reported that Foster said, "The proponents of estate tax repeal are fond of calling it the 'death tax'. It's not a death tax, it's a Rich Kids' tax." In 2009, just before the estate tax was scheduled for a one-year repeal, Foster voted to permanently extend the then current estate tax rate of 45%.

Card check
According to the official Thomas website, Foster co-sponsored the Employee Free Choice Act of 2009, which would enable unionization of small businesses of less than 50 employees. On February 25, 2012, the Daily Herald reported, "Foster pointed to his support for the Employee Free Choice Act while serving at the congressman in the 14th District as proof of his union support."

Stimulus spending
Foster voted for the American Recovery and Reinvestment Act of 2009

Health care reform
Foster voted for the Patient Protection and Affordable Care Act (Obamacare). On June 29, 2012, the Chicago Tribune reported that Foster said of his vote for Obamacare, "I'm proud of my vote, and I would be proud to do it again."

Dodd-Frank
He also voted for the Dodd-Frank Wall Street Reform and Consumer Protection Act, with all ten of the amendments he proposed being added to the final bill.

Environment
He voted against the American Clean Energy and Security Act, which would create a Cap and trade system.

Second Amendment
Asked if the Second Amendment should be up for reinterpretation, Foster said, "It always has been up for reinterpretation. The technology changes, and the weapons thought to be too dangerous to be in private hands change. A Civil War cannon is frankly much less dangerous than weapons we are allowed to carry on the streets in many of the states and cities in our country today. This is something where technology changes and public attitude changes and both are important in each of the generations."

Committee assignments
Current
Committee on Financial Services (2008–2011; 2013–present)
Subcommittee on Capital Markets and Government-Sponsored Enterprises
Subcommittee on Monetary Policy and Trade
Committee on Science, Space, & Technology
Subcommittee on Environment
Select Subcommittee on the Coronavirus Crisis

Past
Committee on Oversight and Government Reform (2008–2011)

Caucus memberships
New Democrat Coalition
Congressional Arts Caucus
U.S.-Japan Caucus

Electoral history

Personal life
Foster and his wife, Aesook Byon, live in Naperville, Illinois. He has two adult children from his first marriage.

Foster is among the few U.S. representatives not to identify with any religion.

References

Further reading
Biggert, Foster square off in 11th Dist. debate, WLS-TV, October 13, 2012, complete video
2012 candidate questionnaire at the Daily Herald
2012 candidate questionnaire at the Northwest Herald
2012 candidate questionnaire at the Chicago Sun-Times
2012 candidate questionnaire at WTTW Chicago Tonight
2012 candidate questionnaire and video at WLS-TV

External links

 Congressman Bill Foster official U.S. House website
 Bill Foster for Congress

  academic papers

|-

|-

1955 births
21st-century American politicians
Businesspeople from Madison, Wisconsin
Democratic Party members of the United States House of Representatives from Illinois
Businesspeople from Illinois
Harvard Graduate School of Arts and Sciences alumni
Living people
Politicians from Madison, Wisconsin
Politicians from Naperville, Illinois
University of Wisconsin–Madison College of Letters and Science alumni
People associated with Fermilab
Fellows of the American Physical Society